Fayçal Hamza (born 6 September 1992) is an Algerian racing cyclist. He rode at the 2013 UCI Road World Championships.

Major results

2011
 3rd Time trial, National Road Championships
 6th Time trial, All-Africa Games
 10th Time trial, African Road Championships
2012
 1st Stage 8 Tour du Faso
 3rd  Team time trial, African Road Championships
2014
 8th Critérium International de Sétif
2015
 2nd Grand Prix d'Oran
2016
 3rd Road race, National Road Championships

References

External links
 

1992 births
Living people
Algerian male cyclists
Place of birth missing (living people)
21st-century Algerian people